Sherando High School is a public secondary school within Frederick County, Virginia, United States, and is part of Frederick County Public Schools. The school is located east of the town of Stephens City.

History
Sherando High School was opened in August 1993 as the second high school in Frederick County. It was built to help alleviate crowding at James Wood High School, the sole high school in the county at the time. The first principal was Dr. John W. Frossard, with assistant principals Gary V. Tisinger and Joseph J. Swack. The latter succeeded Frossard as principal.

The principal is John Nelson.

Accreditation
Sherando High School is a fully accredited high school based on its performance on the Standards of Learning tests in Virginia.

Students
As of 2020–2021 the student body was 71 % White, 16% Hispanic, 5.7% two or more races, 4.9% Black, 1.9% Asian, and less than 1.0% Native Hawaiian/Pacific Islander.

Certain sophomores and juniors are eligible for admission to Mountain Vista Governor's School.

Athletics

The school mascot is a warrior.  The sports teams currently play in the AA Northwestern District and Region II.

Notable alumni
James "Clayster" Eubanks - Esports professional
Grant Golden - college basketball player for the Richmond Spiders, did not graduate, transferred from Sherando after his sophomore year
Kelley Washington - NFL wide receiver for the San Diego Chargers

Band 
The band has received the VBODA Virginia Honor Band recognition a total of 20 times. They first earned it in 1993–94, and they most recently earned it in 2021-2022.

References

External links
Sherando High School
Frederick County Public Schools

Stephens City, Virginia
Educational institutions established in 1993
Public high schools in Virginia
Schools in Frederick County, Virginia
1993 establishments in Virginia